John Eliot Yerxa (April 23, 1904 – June 22, 1967) was an American politician who served on the Boston City Council, the Massachusetts House of Representatives, and the Massachusetts Senate.

Early life
Yerxa was born on April 23, 1904, in Boston. He attended the Noble and Greenough School and the Berkshire School. He graduated from Harvard College in 1926. He planned on a career in civil engineering and his first job out of college was as a draftsman for the Moffat Tunnel Commission in Denver. He returned to Boston after a few months due to a family illness and spent some time studying at Harvard Law School.

Business career
In 1928, Yerxa entered the brokerage business. He was associated with the firm of Townsend, Anthony, & Tyson. He became a member of the Boston Stock Exchange in 1936 and in 1937 joined its board of governors and public relations committee. In 1939 he was elected president of the exchange. At the age of 35, he was the youngest leader in the exchange's history. He retired from the Boston Stock Exchange in May 1942 to join the United States Army Air Corps. He served with the Air Transport Command at Presque Isle Air Force Base and left the service with the rank of lieutenant colonel. After the war, he spent six years as New England regional manager of Pan American World Airways. He then served as vice president of Allied Research & Service Corp.

Personal life
In 1927, Yerxa married Constance Gilpin. She died in 1950. He later married Marjorie Speare, daughter of Frank Palmer Speare. He had one daughter by his first wife and one son and one daughter by his second wife. In 1957 he moved from Boston to Dedham, Massachusetts.

Political career
Yerxa's grandfather, who served on the Cambridge board of selectmen, first interested him in politics. From 1948 to 1951 he was a member of the Boston City Council. From 1953 to 1957 he was a member of the Massachusetts House of Representatives. He then served one term representing the 3rd Suffolk District in the Massachusetts Senate. In 1958, Yerxa was the Republican nominee for state treasurer. He lost to Democratic incumbent John Francis Kennedy 62% to 37%.
Yerxa died on June 22, 1967.

See also
 1953–1954 Massachusetts legislature
 1955–1956 Massachusetts legislature

References

1904 births
1967 deaths
20th-century American politicians
United States Army Air Forces personnel of World War II
Boston City Council members
Harvard College alumni
Republican Party Massachusetts state senators
Republican Party members of the Massachusetts House of Representatives
United States Army Air Forces officers
Presidents of the Boston Stock Exchange